Lake Rosseau/Windermere Water Aerodrome  was located  southeast of Windermere, Ontario, Canada.

See also
 Windermere Airport
 Lake Rosseau/Arthurlie Bay Water Aerodrome
 Lake Rosseau/Cameron Bay Water Aerodrome
 Lake Rosseau/Morgan Bay Water Aerodrome

References

Defunct seaplane bases in Ontario